The streak-backed canastero (Asthenes wyatti) is a species of bird in the family Furnariidae. It is found in Bolivia, Colombia, Ecuador, Peru, and Venezuela. Its natural habitat is subtropical or tropical high-altitude grassland. Seven subspecies are recognized:
Asthenes wyatti wyatti (Sclater, PL & Salvin, 1871) - eastern Andes of northern Colombia
Asthenes wyatti sanctaemartae Todd, 1950 - Santa Marta Mountains (northeastern Colombia)
Asthenes wyatti perijana Phelps Jr, 1977) - northeastern Colombia and northwestern Venezuela
Asthenes wyatti mucuchiesi Phelps & Gilliard, 1941 - Mérida and Trujillo (western Venezuela)
Asthenes wyatti aequatorialis (Chapman, 1921) - central Ecuador
Asthenes wyatti azuay (Chapman, 1923) - southern Ecuador
Asthenes wyatti graminicola (Sclater, PL, 1874) - Peru

References

streak-backed canastero
Birds of the Colombian Andes
Birds of the Ecuadorian Andes
Birds of the Peruvian Andes
Birds of the Venezuelan Andes
streak-backed canastero
streak-backed canastero
streak-backed canastero
Taxonomy articles created by Polbot